Ebba Anna Vailet Hed (born 3 November 1999) is a Swedish professional footballer who plays for Djurgårdens IF.

External links 
 

1999 births
Living people
Swedish women's footballers
IS Halmia players
Vittsjö GIK players
Damallsvenskan players
Women's association football midfielders
Sweden women's youth international footballers
Madrid CFF players